Alejandro José Marqués Méndez (born 4 August 2000) is a professional footballer who plays as a forward for Primeira Liga club Estoril, on loan from Juventus.

Born in Venezuela, he represented Spain at youth level since 2019, and was part of the team that won the 2019 UEFA European Under-19 Championship. He moved to Spain at an early age and holds dual-citizenship.

Club career

Youth 
Born in Caracas, Marqués moved to Spain aged 13 and joined RCD Espanyol's youth setup in 2013. He subsequently moved to UFB Jàbac Terrassa in the following year, before joining FC Barcelona's Juvenil squad on 14 June 2017.

Barcelona B 
Marqués made his senior debut with the reserves on 17 March 2018, coming on as a second-half substitute for Marcus McGuane in a 1–1 away draw against Lorca FC in the Segunda División championship.

Juventus U23 
On 24 January 2020, Barcelona B sold Marqués to Juventus for €8.2 million, in exchange for Matheus Pereira on loan. He made his first appearance for Juventus U23 on 16 February, in a 2–1 Serie C away win over Monza. Marqués' first goal came on 13 July, in a 2–2 draw against Carrarese in the quarter-finals of the Serie C promotion play-offs.

Loans 
On 27 August 2021, Marqués returned to Spain after agreeing to a one-year loan deal with Mirandés in the second division. On 28 July 2022, he was loaned to Estoril.

International career 
While eligible to represent his native Venezuela, Marques was called-up to the Spain national under-19 team. He represented them at the 2019 UEFA European Under-19 Championship, scoring three goals in nine appearances, and helping his side win the title. On 25 May 2022, he was first called up by Venezuela.

Career statistics

Club

Honours
Barcelona
 UEFA Youth League: 2017–18

Juventus U23
 Coppa Italia Serie C: 2019–20

Spain U19
 UEFA European Under-19 Championship: 2019

References

External links
 
 

2000 births
Living people
People from Caracas
Venezuelan footballers
Spanish footballers
Association football forwards
Venezuelan emigrants to Spain
Venezuelan expatriate footballers
Expatriate footballers in Spain
Venezuelan expatriate sportspeople in Spain
Expatriate footballers in Italy
Segunda División players
Serie C players
FC Barcelona players
FC Barcelona Atlètic players
Juventus F.C. players
Juventus Next Gen players
CD Mirandés footballers
G.D. Estoril Praia players
Spain youth international footballers
Venezuelan expatriate sportspeople in Portugal